The Blue Grass Chemical Agent-Destruction Pilot Plant (BGCAPP) is a facility built to destroy the chemical weapons stockpile at the Blue Grass Army Depot (BGAD), near Richmond, Kentucky.

Since 1944, the Army has stored 523 short tons (474 t) of nerve agents sarin (GB) and VX and mustard agent in 155mm projectiles, 8-inch projectiles and M55 rockets at BGAD. That was about 2% of the nation’s original chemical weapons stockpile. 

Now, BGCAPP is using neutralization to destroy the stockpile in the main plant and Static Detonation Chamber technology to augment the main plant.

Destruction of this stockpile is a requirement of the Chemical Weapons Convention, an international treaty to which the United States is a party. The Organisation for the Prohibition of Chemical Weapons is the implementing body of the Chemical Weapons Convention and monitors the progress of the nation's chemical weapons destruction programs. The Program Executive Office, Assembled Chemical Weapons Alternatives (PEO ACWA) oversees the destruction of the Blue Grass chemical weapons stockpile.

Planning and organization
A systems contract was awarded in June 2003 to a joint venture team composed of Bechtel National, Inc., and Parsons Corporation. The Bechtel Parsons Blue Grass team is contracted to develop a design-build plan and then design, construct, systemize, operate and close BGCAPP.

In March 2005 the design-build-operate-close schedule was extended to make the program more affordable on an annual basis. Site preparation work and the construction of support buildings continued and final designs for the remaining BGCAPP facilities were completed in 2010. In June 2019, the Static Detonation Chamber began destroying mustard agent-filled projectiles. In January 2020, the BGCAPP main plant facility began processing nerve agent-filled projectiles. The destruction operations are expected to be complete by 2023. The plant will operate until all the chemical weapons have been destroyed. Closure activities (shut-down, dismantling, and restoration of site) are slated to be wrapped up by 2026. This schedule exceeds the terms of the Chemical Weapons Convention deadline of April 29, 2012.

Legislation enacted by the U.S. Congress in 2007 (Public Laws 110-116 and 110-181) mandates the destruction of the remaining U.S. national chemical stockpile in accordance with the April 2012 date, but in no circumstances later than Dec. 31, 2017. This deadline was subsequently extended to Dec. 31, 2023, by the National Defense Authorization Act for Fiscal Year 2016 (Public Law 114-92).

History of chemical demilitarization in Kentucky

Technology

The Department of Defense conducted studies to evaluate potential impacts of the elimination of these weapons using incineration and non-incineration methods for the plant. Four technologies were considered:  
 Incineration
 Chemical neutralization followed by supercritical water oxidation (SCWO)
 Chemical neutralization followed by supercritical water oxidation and gas phase chemical reduction
 Electrochemical oxidation

Neutralization 
The Department of Defense initially selected neutralization followed by supercritical water oxidation for use at the depot. In 2020, the decision was made to not use the supercritical water oxidation system and instead ship the nerve agent hydrolysate to a permitted treatment, storage and disposal facility.

The neutralization method consists of the following steps:
 Munitions are disassembled by modified reverse assembly.
 The chemical agent is drained from the munitions. The liquid agent is chemically mixed with caustic and water to destroy the chemical agent using hydrolysis. The resulting chemical compound is known as hydrolysate.
 Hydrolysate is held and tested to ensure agent destruction.
 The agent hydrolysate is shipped to Veolia North America near Port Arthur, Texas, for further processing.
The metal parts can then be safely recycled.
 Gas effluents are filtered through a series of HEPA and carbon filters before being released to the atmosphere.

Explosive Destruction Technology (EDT)
After an X-ray assessment of the mustard munitions stockpile showed that the agent had significantly solidified in the rounds—making removal of mustard agent from projectiles difficult using neutralization—ACWA decided to explore use of Explosive Destruction Technology (aka Explosive Demolition Technology, Explosive Detonation Technology, EDT) for these projectiles.

EDT uses heat/pressure from explosion or just heat to destroy the munitions; it is not considered incineration and does not require disassembly of the weapons. There are three general types of technologies that can destroy chemical weapons:
 Detonation Technology – destroys the majority of the agent and explosive in the munition by detonating donor explosives wrapped around the munition. The resulting off-gasses are processed through secondary treatment to ensure agent destruction. Examples of detonation technology include the Transportable Detonation Chamber, or TDC, and the DAVINCH (Detonation of Ammunition in a Vacuum-Integrated Chamber).
 Neutralization Technology – uses small explosive shaped charges to open the munition and consume the explosive in the burster and fuze. The agent is destroyed by subsequent neutralization. The U.S. Army's Explosive Destruction System, or EDS, is an example. 
 Thermal Destruction – uses the heat of the electrically heated containment vessel to deflagrate the munition and destroy the agent and energetics. The resulting gases are treated in an off-gas treatment system. The Static Detonation Chamber, or SDC, is an example of thermal destruction technology.

Bechtel Parsons Blue Grass received approval from PEO ACWA to begin initial work on an Explosive Destruction Technology system at the Blue Grass plant. Following a competitive procurement process, Bechtel Parsons selected the Static Detonation Chamber.

In June 2015, the SDC completed Factory Acceptance Testing at the Dynasafe workshop in Kristinehamn, Sweden. The SDC was assembled and installed at BGCAPP in 2016.

In May 2018, EDT technicians brought the air filtration system online for the first time.

In July 2018, construction substantially completed and testing began on EDT plant equipment in remote operations mode.

In February 2019, a total of 24 B586 conventional munitions were processed in the Static Detonation Chamber as part of systemization activities.

On June 7, 2019, the Static Detonation Chamber, now called the Static Detonation Chamber 1200, entered the operations phase with the successful destruction of the first mustard agent-filled munition.

On Sept. 4, 2021, the final mustard 155mm projectiles in Kentucky were destroyed in the Static Detonation Chamber 1200.

Static Detonation Chamber (SDC) 
In September 2019, BGCAPP received state approval to begin work on a second, larger SDC, called the SDC 2000. Workers broke ground Jan. 22, 2020. The site includes the main structure housing the detonation chamber, a storage magazine and support buildings. 

It began operations on Jan. 27, 2023, destroying the first containerized rocket warhead containing residual amounts of GB nerve agent.

BGCAPP is using the new, larger SDC 2000 to destroy containerized, drained and undrained rocket warheads, as well as M55 rocket overpacks and rockets not suitable to be processed in the main plant.

In September 2021, after the final mustard munition was destroyed at BGCAPP, the original SDC, now known as the SDC 1200, began a changeover process. Once the changeover is completed, this SDC will process drained, containerized, rocket warheads containing residual VX nerve agent and potentially, undrained rocket warheads containing GB nerve agent. SDC 1200 operations are expected to begin by late 2023.

Public outreach
The Blue Grass Chemical Stockpile Outreach Office was established to serve as the community's primary information resource on chemical weapons destruction in Kentucky. The office responds to inquiries, provides information materials and coordinates guest speakers for a variety of different civic groups and organizations and interfaces with the governor-appointed Kentucky Chemical Demilitarization Citizens' Advisory Commission and its Chemical Destruction Community Advisory Board.

References

External links
Centers for Disease Control, Chemical Demilitarization
Chemical Stockpile Emergency Preparedness Program (Kentucky)
U.S. Army Chemical Materials Activity
Blue Grass Army Depot website

Buildings and structures in Madison County, Kentucky
United States chemical weapons depots
United States Army arsenals
Military installations in Kentucky
Chemical weapons destruction facilities